Roll Out the Red Carpet is the debut solo album by Hard Boyz frontman, Royal C. Royal C, whose group the Hard Boyz had recently joined Atlantic Records, had also signed a deal with a major label, Epic Records, who placed Royal C on their subsidiary Epic Street, which specialized in the hip hop genre. Epic released the album on August 13, 1996 with popular hip-hop/R&B producer Colin Wolfe producing the entire album. With the exception of a music video for the album's lead single "They Don't Want None", Epic failed to promote the album and it did not do well sales-wise, which eventually led to Epic dropping Royal C from the label.

Track listing
"Ghetto Court 1" – 0:50  
"They Don't Want None" – 4:01  
"Rollin' on the East Side" – 4:03  
"Ballin' on the Ave" – 3:59  
"Da Product" – 4:17  
"Real G's" – 4:18  
"Eye for An Eye" – 4:20  
"Daggon Hoez" – 1:15  
"2 O'Clock In the Morning" – 3:55  
"Livin' In da Hood" – 3:59 (Featuring Joi)  
"Why Y'all Wanna Trip" – 4:28  
"Cyndrome" – 3:31  
"Fallin'" – 4:06  
"Crooked By Nature" – 4:50  
"Ghetto Court 2" – 1:31

External links
[ Roll Out the Red Carpet] at Allmusic
Roll Out the Red Carpet at Discogs
Roll Out the Red Carpet at Tower Records

1996 debut albums
Hard Boyz albums